The 2005 UMass Minutemen football team represented the University of Massachusetts Amherst in the 2005 NCAA Division I FCS football season as a member of the Atlantic 10 Conference.  The team was coached by Don Brown and played its home games at Warren McGuirk Alumni Stadium in Hadley, Massachusetts.  The Minutemen finished second in the North division of the A-10 with a record of 7–4 (6–2 A-10).

Schedule

References

UMass
UMass Minutemen football seasons
UMass Minutemen football